Associação Académica de Maputo, usually known as Académica, is a sports club from Maputo, Mozambique. It features teams in football (soccer), Roller hockey (quad) and volleyball.

Football clubs in Mozambique
Volleyball clubs
Roller hockey teams